Gurkhaneh (also Romanized as Gūrkhāneh, Kyurakhane, and Qūrkhāneh) is a village in Khandan Rural District, Tarom Sofla District, Qazvin County, Qazvin Province, Iran. At the 2006 census, its population was 25, in 9 families.

References 

Populated places in Qazvin County